This article lists important figures and events in Malaysian public affairs during the year 2005, together with births and deaths of notable Malaysians.

Incumbent political figures

Federal level
Yang di-Pertuan Agong: Tuanku Syed Sirajuddin
Raja Permaisuri Agong: Tuanku Fauziah
Prime Minister: Dato' Sri Abdullah Ahmad Badawi
Deputy Prime Minister: Dato' Sri Najib Tun Razak (to 7 January)
Chief Justice: Ahmad Fairuz Abdul Halim

State level
 Sultan of Johor: Sultan Iskandar
 Sultan of Kedah: Sultan Abdul Halim Muadzam Shah
 Sultan of Kelantan: Sultan Ismail Petra
 Raja of Perlis: Tuanku Syed Faizuddin (Regent)
 Sultan of Perak: Sultan Azlan Shah
 Sultan of Pahang: Sultan Ahmad Shah
 Sultan of Selangor: Sultan Sharafuddin Idris Shah
 Sultan of Terengganu: Sultan Mizan Zainal Abidin (Deputy Yang di-Pertuan Agong)
 Yang di-Pertuan Besar of Negeri Sembilan: Tuanku Jaafar
 Yang di-Pertua Negeri (Governor) of Penang: Tun Abdul Rahman Abbas
 Yang di-Pertua Negeri (Governor) of Malacca: Tun Mohd Khalid Yaakob
 Yang di-Pertua Negeri (Governor) of Sarawak: Tun Abang Muhammad Salahuddin
 Yang di-Pertua Negeri (Governor) of Sabah: Tun Ahmad Shah Abdullah

Events
1 January – THR Raaga and Gegar was officially inaugurated by Astro and was on air over 16 states of Malaysia.
15 February – The Malaysian Maritime Enforcement Agency (MMEA) (Malaysian Coast Guard) was founded.
9 March – A student from Johor Bahru, Johor, Nur Amalina Che Bakri scored a record 17A1s in the 2004 Sijil Pelajaran Malaysia (SPM) examinations.
1 April – Siti Nurhaliza held a concert in Royal Albert Hall, London for the first time.
18 May – On Teacher's Day, a seven-year-old girl from Sekolah Rendah Agama Rantau Panjang religious school Nur Salina Saparedi was hit by a lorry while she was crossing the road at North Klang Straits Bypass in Klang, Selangor.
20 May – Miri was granted city status and became the second city of Sarawak, after state capital Kuching.
June – A fault in the transmission line of the National Grid near Serendah, Selangor caused a blackout in northern Peninsular Malaysia.
June – Malaysian squash player Nicol David captured the World Open title in Hong Kong and become the World No.1 in woman's squash. She was the first Asian woman to be ranked World No. 1 in the sport.
July – Dr Judson Sakai anak Tagal, the Sarawak state assemblyman for Ba'kelalan, was killed in a helicopter crash in Ba'kelalan, Sarawak.
10 July – The NKVE-Jalan Meru flyover (now Setia Alam Interchange) collapsed onto the New Klang Valley Expressway (NKVE), killing two Bangladeshi workers and injuring seven others.
18 July – A group of masked vigilantes attacked the Sky Kingdom's headquarters, smashing windows and torching buildings. Two days later, 58 followers of the Sky Kingdom sect were arrested, and on 31 July three of Ariffin Mohamed known as Ayah Pin's four wives were also arrested in Kelantan. Ariffin, the leader of the sect escaped arrest and remains at large as a fugitive wanted by the Malaysian authorities. Forty-five members faced charges of failing to observe the government fatwa (i.e. for continuing to be members of a sect declared as deviant), which carried a fine up to RM 3,000 or two years in prison. One of those arrested faced an additional charge of "humiliating Islam" (for claiming not to be a Muslim).
1 August – Officials of the Besut Land Office demolished Sky Kingdom's various buildings, citing Section 129 of the National Land Code (which punishes unauthorised construction with land confiscation).
3 August – Mawi won the Akademi Fantasia Season 3 and became one of the top Malaysian male singers.
9 August – Rakan Cop, the Malaysian community police was launched.
10 August – The National Biofuel Policy was introduced.
11 August – Haze: A state of emergency was declared in Kuala Selangor and Port Klang.
27 August – Selangor was declared as the first developed state in Malaysia.
5 September – A Malaysian named Ti Teow Chuan from Sabah was among the passengers who died on Mandala Airlines Flight 91 that crashed into a heavily populated residential area in Medan, Indonesia, killing 149 including 49 people in the ground.
1 October – Kota Bharu, capital of Kelantan state, was declared the first Islamic city in Malaysia.
9 October – Azahari Husin, a Malaysian national and Islamic terrorist was killed in a police raid on his hideout in Indonesia.
20 October – Endon Mahmood, wife of the incumbent Malaysian Prime Minister Abdullah Ahmad Badawi died. Her body was laid to rest at the Muslim cemetery in Taman Selatan, Precinct 20, Putrajaya.
29 November – First Monsoon Cup international regatta held in Terengganu.
6 December – Federal governing coalition Barisan Nasional won the Pengkalan Pasir by-election in Kelantan.
14 December – The 11th ASEAN Summit and East Asian Summit were held in Kuala Lumpur.

Births
17 January – Amirul Farhan Shahruddin – Actor 
11 February – Zali Rusli – Singer
13 February – Muhammad Akid Mohd Zamri – Footballer 
14 February – Muhammad Adam Afandi Shaharudin – Film director
21 February – Sheikh Edian Sheikh Farouk – Footballer 
26 March – Ahmad Danish Muhd Fitri – Actor
12 April – Muhammad Alif Fahmy Khairul Anuar – Track cyclist 
25 April – Muhammad Hazriq Danish Abdullah – Singer
5 May – Mohammad Haykal Danish Mohd Haizon – Footballer 
24 May – Fariz Isqandar – Actor
18 June – Muhammad Ashraff Mohd Rizal – Rapper
19 June – Dhia Azrai Naim Rosman – Actor 
20 August – Mohamad Nazmi Mokhtar – Film director
23 August – Brenda Anellia Larry – Swimmer
27 August – Zairin Nazmi Zaidi – Actor
10 September – Puvanan Sekar – Footballer 
10 October – Adam Haikal Azizol – Footballer 
16 October – Muhammad Zuryhakim Mohd Zafran – Footballer 
1 November – Ahmad Shahmi Md Azhar – Filmmaker
2 November – Muhammad Khir Shah Ramdhan Abdul Rani – Actor
11 November – Aimanaimin Khusairi – Producer
26 December – Muhammad Amir Idlan Azman – Actor

Deaths
17 October – Sidek Abdullah Kamar – Father of former Malaysian national badminton players
13 November – Tan Sri Dr. Tan Chin Tuan – Former OCBC Bank (Malaysia) chairman (1966–1983)
29 December – Tan Sri Dr Noordin Sopiee – Executive Chairman of the Institute of Strategic and International Studies (ISIS)

See also
 2005
 2004 in Malaysia | 2006 in Malaysia
 History of Malaysia
 List of Malaysian films of 2005

References 

 
Years of the 21st century in Malaysia
2000s in Malaysia
Malaysia
Malaysia